Namit Das (born 10 July 1984) is an Indian film, television, theatre actor and singer. He has acted in several television commercials. He belongs to a family of musicians and singers; his father is reputed ghazal singer Chandan Dass. His maternal grandfather was K. Pannalal, who worked for Delhi All India Radio and Doordarshan, and was a musician par excellence. One of his maternal uncles, Jaidev Kumar, is a famous Punjabi music director, and another is Ajay K. Pannalal, a Punjabi film director. Namit is also a trained singer and took classical-music training from his father Chandan Dass and Bhavdeep Jaipurwale, but preferred acting over singing for a long time. Recently he has released an album with Anurag Shanker, which has five tracks.

Namit Das married his longtime girlfriend Shruti Vyas on 15 February 2015. Shruti herself is a theater and film actress and has appeared in many ads, including an OLX Womaniyan ad, where she was the face of OLX. She is the sister of actor Sumeet Vyas. Namit and Shruti got married in Mumbai in a traditional ceremony, graced by family and friends. Namit's younger brother Anshul Nautiyal is also an underground music producer who is Delhi-based.

Filmography

Films

TV series

Plays

Das has worked in a number of plays.

Dubbing roles

Live action films

References

1984 births
Living people
21st-century Indian male actors
Male actors in Hindi cinema
Male actors in Hindi television
Indian male stage actors